Like all modern Celtic languages, Breton is characterised by initial consonant mutations, which are changes to the initial sound of a word caused by certain syntactic or morphological environments.  In addition, Breton, like French, has a number of purely phonological sandhi features caused when certain sounds come into contact with others.

The mutations are divided into four main groups, according to the changes they cause: soft mutation (Breton ), hard mutation, spirant mutation and mixed mutation.  There are also a number of defective (or incomplete) mutations which affect only certain words or certain letters.

Summary of sound changes
The main mutations cause the following changes:

Functions of mutations
The role which initial mutations play in Breton grammar can be divided into three categories (which are not mutually exclusive):
 Linking (or contact) mutations – these occur systematically after certain words called mutators, of which there are around 100 in Breton.
  "father" →  "your father"
  "mother" →  "two mothers"
 Gender-number-distinctive mutations – these occur after the articles and in postposed adjectives to mark gender and number.
  "boy" (m.):  "the nice boy", but  "the nice boys"
  "country" (f.):  "the small country" but  "the small countries"
  and :  "the grandfather" and  "the grandmother"
 Mutations of recognition – these mark the distinction between homophones (e.g.  "his" &  "her") and are useful in the comprehension of the spoken language.
  "his brother" but  "her brother"
  "their house" but  "your house"

Soft mutation
The soft mutation is by far the most frequent mutation in Breton, both in terms of the number of consonants it affects and the number of environments in which it occurs.

Environments

After definite and indefinite articles 
The definite article  and the indefinite  cause the soft mutation of:
 Most feminine singular nouns:
  "a mother"
 Masculine plural nouns denoting people:
  "the Frenchmen"
Nouns beginning with d- and a few others do not mutate after the articles.

After proclitics 
The following grammatical words cause mutations to a following word: 
  "to Cornwall"
 The interrogative pronoun  "what":
  "what man?"
 The possessive pronouns  "your",  "his":
  "your head"
  "his father"
  "I see people"
  "do not sing"
  "may he return quickly"
 The numerals  "two (masculine)",  "two (feminine)":
 ' "two girls"
 The conjunctions  "if, when",  "or",  "while"
  "he was old when he died"
  "one person or another"
 The adverb  "too":
  "too small"
 The pronouns  "all",  "those, ones",  "that, one":
  "all the houses"

After adjectives and nouns 
The soft mutation occurs in:
 Adjectives following feminine singular nouns:
  "beautiful chair"
 Adjectives following masculine plural nouns referring to people:
  "good brothers"
 Nouns following adjectives:
  "in few words"

These mutations are limited.  When the first word ends in a vowel or  it causes the soft mutation wherever possible, but when the first word ends in any other consonant only the consonants  change in the following words.

Spirant mutation

Environments
The mutation occurs following:
 The possessive pronouns  "her",  "their,  "my" and (in the Trégorrois dialect)  "our":
  "her father"
  "their son"
  "my dog"
 The numerals  "three (masc.)",  "three (fem.)",  "four (masc.)",  "four (fem.)", nav "nine":
  "three houses"
  "nine fish"

In the spoken language the spirant mutation is usually replaced with the soft mutation after numerals.

Defective mutations
 The mutation of t and k occurs following the infixed pronoun  "me" (with verbal particles),  "to my" and  "in my":
  "in my house"
 Mutation of k occurs following  "our":
  "our car"
 The word  "Easter" becomes  following the days  "Sunday" and  "Monday".

Hard mutation

Environments
The mutation is caused by:
 Possessive pronoun  "your (plural)":
  "your brother"
 Infixed pronoun  "you (singular)" (with verbal particles),  "to your (sg.)",  "in your (sg.)":
  "in your hands"
  "to your boat"
  "my brother saw you"

Mixed mutation

Environments
The mixed mutation occurs after:
 The verbal particles  and 
  "I am going to Brest"
  "I believe that he will come"
 The conjunction  "if"
  "I would be happy if he came"

Mutations and external sandhi
All of the consonant mutations described above began as simple phonological processes in the Common Brittonic language from which Breton arose and became standardised as grammatical processes as the language developed.  Similar phonological processes continued to affect Breton and cause changes to word-initial sounds, but they are usually applied based on the phonology of the preceding word and not on its function.  Because of this, they cannot be described as true initial mutations and are more properly aspects of external sandhi.

Nasalisation 
The true nasal mutation which occurs in Welsh never occurred in Breton and Cornish, where it was replaced by the Spirant Mutation (compare Welsh  "my dog" with Breton ).  But there was assimilation of the voiced plosives, particularly b, d to a preceding nasal and this was often written in Middle Breton.

Today it is only written with  "the door" but can still be heard dialectally in other words, e.g.   "one" (lit. "the person") and  "some" .

Spirantisation 
Today, a number of nouns beginning with k change to c'h following the articles  "the" and  "a":
  "the castle"
  "a horse"
Although this is the same process seen in the spirant mutation (e.g. following  "our"), it is really an external sandhi which has become fixed in writing.

"Interchangeable" consonants 
Breton has a series of 'interchangeable' consonants, composed of plosives and fricatives.  When these sounds occur word-finally, they may be pronounced voiceless or voiced depending on the word that follows:
 The sounds are voiceless when the word is followed by a voiceless sound or a pause.
 The sounds are voiced when the following word begins with a voiced consonant or a vowel.

The table below shows the 'interchangeable' consonants:

These changes are never written but occur regularly, regardless of how the final consonant is spelled:
  "good priest"  vs.  
  "ten people"  vs.

Exceptions 
 When two equivalent or identical consonants come together (e.g. p/b or z/z), both consonants become voiceless:
  "ten beds" 
  "a year ago" 
 Some words ending in s/z or ch/j resist voicing.

More information on this phenomenon can be found in the thesis of François Falc'hun: .

Orthography of mutations
In Old and Middle Breton, it was extremely rare to write the consonant mutations. Around the 17th century, the Jesuits started to learn Breton and introduced the writing of mutations.

Sometimes, the mutated letter is written before the radical letter in the style of the Gaelic languages, to make recognition easier.  This is largely confined to proper nouns (e.g.  "the virgin Maria" is pronounced ).

Some processes which are properly part of external sandhi have become crystallised in the written language, whilst others have not.

References
 

Breton grammar
Morphophonology